John 1:6 is the sixth verse in the first chapter of the Gospel of John in the New Testament of the Christian Bible.

Content
In the original Greek according to Westcott-Hort, this verse is:
Ἐγένετο ἄνθρωπος ἀπεσταλμένος παρὰ Θεοῦ, ὄνομα αὐτῷ Ἰωάννης.  

In the King James Version of the Bible the text reads:
There was a man sent from God, whose name was John.

The New International Version translates the passage as:
There came a man who was sent from God; his name was John.

The New Living Translation identifies John as "John the Baptist".

Analysis
Irish Archbishop John McEvilly reflects that the object of John here seems to be to correct a prevailing error that the Baptist was the Messiah (Luke 3:15; John 1:19). While doing this he refers to John, who was commonly thought to be a Prophet (Matthew 21:26), as a key witness to prove that Jesus was the Christ, "the Son of God", for this was the chief aim of this gospel (John 20:31). Henry Alford suggests that "sent by God" may refer back to Malachi 3:1: Behold, I send My messenger.

Commentary from the Church Fathers
Augustine: "What is said above, refers to the Divinity of Christ. He came to us in the form of man, but man in such sense, as that the Godhead was concealed within Him. And therefore there was sent before a great man, to declare by his witness that He was more than man. And who was this? He was a man."

Theophylact of Ohrid: "Not an Angel, as many have held. The Evangelist here refutes such a notion."

Augustine: "And how could he declare the truth concerning God, unless he were sent from God."

Chrysostom: "After this esteem nothing that he says as human; for he speaketh not his own, but his that sent him. And therefore the Prophet calls him a messenger, I send My messenger, (Mal. 3:1) for it is the excellence of a messenger, to say nothing of his own. But the expression, was sent, does not mean his entrance into life, but to his office. As Esaias was sent on his commission, not from any place out of the world, but from where he saw the Lord sitting upon His high and lofty throne; (Isai. 6:1.) in like manner John was sent from the desert to baptize; for he says, He that sent me to baptize with water, the same said unto me, Upon Whom thou shalt see the Spirit descending, and remaining on Him, the same is He which baptizeth with the Holy Ghost. (John 1:33)"

Augustine: "What was he called? whose name was John?"

Alcuin: "That is, the grace of God, or one in whom is grace, who by his testimony first made known to the world the grace of the New Testament, that is, Christ. Or John may be taken to mean, to whom it is given: because that through the grace of God, to him it was given, not only to herald, but also to baptize the King of kings."

References

External links
Other translations of John 1:6 at BibleHub

01:6